Kunzea micromera is a flowering plant in the myrtle family, Myrtaceae and is endemic to the south west of Western Australia. It is a small, sparse shrub, similar in some respects to K. micrantha but has shorter, more rounded sepal lobes. It produces groups of pink flowers on the ends of a few long shoots in spring.

Description
The flowers are arranged in heads of mostly twelve to twenty on the ends of a few long shoots. Flowering occurs between August and November and is followed by fruit which are urn-shaped capsules with an obvious bulge and with the sepals remaining.

Taxonomy and naming
Kunzea micromera was first formally described in 1848 by the botanist Johannes Conrad Schauer in Johann Georg Christian Lehmann's work Plantae Preissianae. The specific epithet (micromera) is derived from the ancient Greek words  meaning "small" and  meaning "part".

Distribution and habitat
Often found in wet depressions and the margins of swamps between Stokes Inlet, Albany, Narrogin and Newdegate in the Avon Wheatbelt, Esperance Plains, Jarrah Forest, Mallee, Swan Coastal Plain and Warren biogeographic regions, K. micromera grows in sandy or clay soils.

References

micromera
Endemic flora of Western Australia
Myrtales of Australia
Rosids of Western Australia
Plants described in 1848